Amazon Bookstore Cooperative was a feminist bookstore located in Minneapolis, Minnesota, that operated from 1970 to 2012. It was the first lesbian/feminist bookstore in the U.S. The shop was named after the Amazons, a mythological tribe of fierce and independent women. In 1994 Amazon.com was founded and within a year, problems started for Amazon Bookstore. Terms of a lawsuit by Amazon bookstore resulted in a small settlement, and a requirement that Amazon Bookstore go by the name 'Amazon Bookstore Collective' to reduce confusion with Amazon.com.

Early years
In 1970 when Amazon was founded by Rosina Richter Christy and Julie Morse Quist, it was far from a full-fledged bookstore. The books were kept in the front room of the women's collective they lived in and books were only available from 3 to 6 PM or by special arrangement. This arrangement lasted for about two years before the book store moved to Minneapolis' Lesbian Resource Center and then migrated through a series of different storefront addresses.  Working conditions were sometimes difficult and included an unsafe neighborhood and a building with no heat where pipes froze and people had to wear gloves inside the store.

Lawsuit
In 1999, the cooperative sued Amazon.com for trademark infringement. After sometimes acrimonious legal proceedings, the case was settled in November of that year, with Amazon Bookstore assigning its common law rights in the Amazon name to Amazon.com; and Amazon.com giving a license back to Amazon Bookstore Cooperative for use of the Amazon name.

True Colors

The business announced that they were closing down at the end of June 2008, and buyers came forth to carry on the store as an independent bookstore. Ruta Skujins, with the help of her partner, Joann Bell, decided to take over the store. Transfer of the ownership of the store happened at the end of June, according to an e-mail sent by the store to customers on June 17.

In November 2008 it was announced that the store changed ownership and as a result, the Amazon name could not be used by the new owner as it was owned by Amazon.com. The new owner of the bookstore, Ruta Skujins, changed the name of the store to True Colors Bookstore, and both names were in use during the transition period. The bookstore began experiencing financial difficulties in late 2011, with the store closing in February 2012 due to this.

Influence and significance
Amazon became "the oldest independent feminist bookstore in North America" and was probably "the oldest in the English speaking world". It had an impact that extended both beyond its immediate area and beyond the United States.

It also had a presence in popular culture. Cartoonist and graphic novelist Alison Bechdel was inspired to create the fictional Madwimmin Books in Dykes to Watch Out For based on experiences at the store.

References

External links
Official site

Independent bookstores of the United States
Feminist bookstores
LGBT bookstores
Cooperatives in the United States
Defunct companies based in Minneapolis
Feminist organizations in the United States
Lesbian feminist organizations
Lesbian organizations in the United States
Women in Minnesota
Bookstores established in the 20th century
Business services companies established in 1970
Organizations established in 1970
Organizations disestablished in 2008
Retail companies established in 1970
Retail companies disestablished in 2012
1970 establishments in Minnesota
2012 disestablishments in Minnesota
American companies established in 1970
Defunct companies based in Minnesota
Defunct retail companies of the United States